G. Bruce Boyer (born 1941) is a journalist who was the fashion editor for Town & Country. Often cited as an authority on men's fashion, he was formerly fashion editor for GQ and Esquire. Before his career in menswear journalism, Boyer studied English literature in Moravian and holds a graduate and master's degree in the subject. He has also worked as an English literature professor for seven years.

Bibliography 
Elegance: A Guide to Quality in Menswear (Norton, 1985)
Eminently Suitable (Norton, 1990)
Fred Astaire Style (Assouline, 2004)
Rebel Style (Assouline, 2006)
Gary Cooper – Enduring Style (PowerHouse Books, 2011)
True Style: The History & Principles of Classic Menswear (Basic Books, 2015)

References

Living people
American fashion journalists
1941 births